Albert Keates (14 July 1862 in Hanley, Staffordshire – 25 June 1949 in Sheffield) was a pipe organ builder based in Sheffield who flourished between 1889 and 1948.

Career 
He started his employment at John Stringer and Co in Hanley. Later he progressed to become head voicer at Brindley & Foster in Sheffield.

In 1885 he formed the partnership Lowe and Keates with Edwin Lowe, but this was short-lived, being dissolved on 8 October 1888, and in 1889 he formed his own business, based in a premises on Charlotte Road in Sheffield, which built some 90 new organs and also some restorations.

He was influenced by the German organ builder, Johann Friedrich Schulze, and adopted his style in the manufacture of Diapasons, which give Keates organs their distinctive tone.

The largest organ built by the company was in 1931 for Uppingham School, which had 44 stops and 3 manuals.

In 1950 the company was absorbed into Harris Organs in Birmingham.

References

This article contains information retrieved from the German Wikipedia.

Organ builders of the United Kingdom
Manufacturing companies established in 1889
People from Hanley, Staffordshire
1889 establishments in England
Defunct companies based in Sheffield
Manufacturing companies based in Sheffield
1862 births
1949 deaths
Manufacturing companies disestablished in 1950
1950 disestablishments in England
Musical instrument manufacturing companies of the United Kingdom